The brown sole (Achirus klunzingeri) is a sole of the genus Achirus native to the eastern Pacific from central Mexico to northernmost Peru. It is found at depths of 10–40 m on sandy and muddy grounds and may enter fresh waters in estuaries and mangroves. Its diet consists of invertebrates, small fishes, pelagic eggs and larvae.

References

brown sole
Western Central American coastal fauna
Fish of Colombia
Fish of Ecuador
brown sole